Riad Barmada (July 26, 1929 – January 10, 2014), a Syrian-American orthopaedic surgeon and professor. Barmada was the head of orthopedics at the University of Illinois at Chicago from 1984 to 1998 and served as the president of the Illinois Orthopedic Society and president of the Chicago Committee on Trauma.

Early life and education 
Barmada was born in 1929 and grew up in Aleppo. His father was a judge in Syria and his uncles were Mustafa Bey Barmada former Governor-General of the State of Aleppo and Rashad Barmada minister of Defense in Syria. Barmada completed his medical degree from University of Damascus in 1956 and completed a one-year general surgery residency there before going to Chicago.

Baramda completed an internship at Walther Memorial Hospital, followed by residencies in orthopedic surgery at St. Elizabeth Hospital, Illinois Masonic Hospital, and the University of Illinois Hospital.

Career 
In 1967, he joined the faculty of University of Illinois at Chicago (UIC) College of Medicine as a research associate and became a professor of orthopedics in 1972. He headed the department from 1984 to 1998. He retired in 1999 but remained professor emeritus.

He was a member of numerous associations, including the International Society of Orthopaedic Surgery and Traumatology, American Academy of Orthopaedic Surgeons, American Orthopaedic Association, American Medical Association, and Illinois State Medical Society, Dr. Barmada was a Fellow of the American College of Surgeons, president of the Chicago Committee on Trauma, and served as president of the Illinois Orthopaedic Society in 1991.

According to Google Scholar, Barmada has an h-index of 20. According to the Scopus he has an h-index of 16.

Books 
 Orthopedic Surgery Case Studies: 40 Case Histories Related to Orthopedic Surgery.
 Pathophysiology of Orthopedic Diseases.

Selected journal publications 
Misoprostol Inhibits Polymethylmethacrylate-Stimulated Lysosomal Degranulation and IL-1 Release from Neutrophils 
 Optimisation of the posterior stabilised tibial post for greater femoral rollback after total knee arthroplasty—a finite element analysis
 Factors influencing initial cup stability in total hip arthroplasty.
Polymorphonuclear leukocyte degranulation with exposure to polymethylmethacrylate nanoparticles.

References 

Medicine, College of
Barmada family
1929 births
2014 deaths
People from Aleppo
Physicians from Chicago
Syrian emigrants to the United States
Damascus University alumni
Syrian surgeons
American surgeons
20th-century American scientists
American orthopedic surgeons
Syrian orthopedic surgeons
Syrian academics